Joseph Trotter Mills (December 18, 1812November 22, 1897) was an American attorney, jurist, Republican politician, and Wisconsin pioneer.  He served four one-year terms in the Wisconsin State Assembly, and was Wisconsin circuit court judge for the 5th circuit from 1865 through 1877.

Biography
Born in 1812 in Cane Ridge, Kentucky, near Paris, Joseph Trotter Mills as a youth lived and studied with his uncle Benjamin Mills, who was a judge of the Kentucky Court of Appeals. Moving west, in 1831 Mills studied at Illinois College in Jacksonville, Illinois.

He worked as a tutor in 1834 and 1835, teaching the children of Colonel Zachary Taylor, then commanding officer of Fort Crawford, Prairie du Chien, Michigan Territory. Later Mills married and had a family.

He prepared to change his work by reading the law with an established firm; in 1844, he was admitted to the Wisconsin bar. He practiced law in Lancaster, Wisconsin. From 1865 to 1877, Mills served as Wisconsin Circuit Court judge. In 1856, 1857, 1862, and 1879, Mills served in the Wisconsin State Assembly as a Republican. His son-in-law, James Sibree Anderson, was also a member of the Assembly.

Mills died at his son's home in Denver, Colorado.

References

External links
 

1812 births
1897 deaths
People from Paris, Kentucky
People from Lancaster, Wisconsin
Illinois College alumni
Wisconsin lawyers
Wisconsin state court judges
Zachary Taylor
People from Bourbon County, Kentucky
Republican Party members of the Wisconsin State Assembly